This is a list of electoral results for the Electoral district of Coles in South Australian state elections from 1970 to 1997.

Members for Coles

Election results

Elections in the 1990s

Elections in the 1980s

Elections in the 1970s

References 

SA elections archive: Antony Green ABC

South Australian state electoral results by district